The 1981 World's Strongest Man was the fifth edition of World's Strongest Man and was won by Bill Kazmaier from the United States. It was his second title. Geoff Capes from the United Kingdom finished second after finishing third the previous year, and Dave Waddington from the United States finished third. The contest was held at Magic Mountain, California.

This was the first World's Strongest Man competition where the Tug Of War did not end the competition. Previously, the four highest scorers after the penultimate event competed in a head to head tug of war battle with the last man standing winning the event.

Events
There were a total of 11 different events used in the competition:
 Overhead Log lift (wooden log) – Winner Bill Kazmaier 360lbs
 Weight Toss (56lbs weight over bar throw) – Winner Geoff Capes 17 feet 1/4 inch
 Truck Pull (16200lbs truck pull over 100foot course in heats) – Winner Geoff Capes 30.95 s
 Engine Race (800lbs over 150feet uphill course) – Winner Bill Kazmaier
 Beer Keg Load – (12 kegs 167 lbs. each) – Bill Kazmaier in 49.11 s
 Battery Hold (65 lbs. at arm's length) – Winner Durwin Piper 43.63 s
 Steel Bar Bend – Winner Geoff Capes
 Cement Block Squat (Smith machine squat) – Winner Bill Kazmaier 969 lbs.
 Silver Dollar Deadlift (18" off the floor with straps allowed) Winner Bill Kazmaier 940lbs (executed two repetitions)
 Caber Toss – Winner Joe Zaliezniak 40'
 Sumo Challenge – Winner Keith Bishop

Final results

References

External links
 Official site

World's Strongest
World's Strongest Man
1981 in sports in California